Cathryn (Cat) Finlayson (born 24 August 1988) is a New Zealand field hockey player. She has competed for the New Zealand women's national field hockey team (the Black Sticks Women) since 2010, including for the team at the 2012 Summer Olympics.

References

External links
 

1988 births
Living people
New Zealand female field hockey players
Olympic field hockey players of New Zealand
Field hockey players at the 2012 Summer Olympics
Sportspeople from Palmerston North
21st-century New Zealand women